Jason Evans (born 1971) in Neath, Wales, is a South African lawn bowler.

Bowls career
He competed in the pairs and fours at the 2014 Commonwealth Games and was selected as part of the South Africa team for the 2018 Commonwealth Games on the Gold Coast in Queensland.

He finished runner-up in the 2013 fours at the National Championships bowling for the Belgravia Bowls Club.

In 2019 he won the triples gold medal at the Atlantic Bowls Championships and in 2020 he was selected for the 2020 World Outdoor Bowls Championship in Australia.

In 2021 he won the men's pairs title at the South African National Bowls Championships. 
In 2022, he competed in the men's singles and the men's triples at the 2022 Commonwealth Games.

References

1971 births
Living people
Bowls players at the 2014 Commonwealth Games
Bowls players at the 2022 Commonwealth Games
South African male bowls players
Commonwealth Games competitors for South Africa